Farid Mokhtari  is an Iranian football forward who plays for Giti Pasand  in the Azadegan League.

References

1991 births
Living people
Malavan players
Association football forwards
Iranian footballers
Giti Pasand players